The following lists events that happened during 1824 in New Zealand.

Incumbents

Regal and viceregal
Head of State – King George IV
Governor of New South Wales – Major-General Sir Thomas Brisbane is recalled on 29 December but only leaves in December 1825 when his  successor, General Ralph Darling, arrives. Darling is appointed this year but only arrives in New South Wales on 25 December 1825.

Events 
3 April – George Clarke arrives in the Bay of Islands having taken passage from Sydney on board the French corvette La Coquille. La Coquille is commanded by Louis Isidore Duperrey, with Jules Dumont d'Urville as second-in-command, and will go on to complete a global circumnavigation.
 31 August - The Revd. Henry Williams lays the keel for the 55-ton schooner , the first sailing ship (schooner) built in New Zealand.
Undated
George Clarke starts one of the first schools for Māori children, at Kerikeri.
John Kelly marries (Mary) Hine-tuhawaiki and settles at Ruapuke Island. Hine may have been a relative of Tuhawaiki 'Bloody Jack', later paramount chief of Ngāi Tahu, whose stronghold was on Ruapuke.
James Spencer sets up a trading post for whalers visiting Foveaux Strait at Bluff which is claimed to be the earliest permanent European settlement which will later grow into a town.

Births
 6 April (in England): George Waterhouse, 7th Premier of New Zealand.
 1 May (in Germany): Julius von Haast, geologist
 24 November (in England): Richard Barcham Shalders, founder of the YMCA in New Zealand.
 c. 18 December (in England): John Hall, 12th Premier of New Zealand
 23 December (in England): Thomas Potts, naturalist.
Undated
 (in Ireland): Thomas Henry FitzGerald, politician.
 (in Australia): Gabriel Read, gold prospector.

Deaths

See also
List of years in New Zealand
Timeline of New Zealand history
History of New Zealand
Military history of New Zealand
Timeline of the New Zealand environment
Timeline of New Zealand's links with Antarctica

References